Tom Luse is an American film producer best known for The Walking Dead, a TV series of which he was the producer and executive producer.

Filmography

References

External links
 

American film producers
American film directors
Living people
Year of birth missing (living people)